Jean Baptista von Schweitzer (July 12, 1833 – July 28, 1875) was a German politician and dramatic poet and playwright.

Life and political career
Schweitzer was born at Frankfurt am Main, of an old aristocratic Catholic family. He studied law in Berlin and Heidelberg, and afterwards practised in his native city. He was, however, generally more interested in politics and literature than law.

Schweitzer was attracted by the social democratic movement, then led in Germany by Ferdinand Lassalle. Lassalle defended him from calls for his expulsion from the movement after he was convicted of a morals charge for homosexual activities in 1862, arguing that sexuality "ought to be left up to each person" whenever no one else is harmed.

After Lasalle's death in 1864 Schweitzer became president of the General German Workers' Association (ADAV).  The ADAV began fracturing soon thereafter, as disputes over whether to cooperate with Otto von Bismarck's government led Wilhelm Liebknecht and others to leave the ADAV in the years after 1864. Liebknecht and August Bebel founded the Social Democratic Workers' Party of Germany (SDAP) in 1869.

Schweitzer edited the Sozialdemokrat, which brought him into frequent trouble with the Prussian government. In 1867 he was elected to the parliament of the North German Federation. In 1868, he coined the term "democratic centralization" to describe the structure of his organization. On his failure to secure election to the German Reichstag in 1871, he resigned the presidency of the ADAV and retired from political life. The ADAV later merged with the SDAP at the Gotha Congress in 1875 to form the Socialist Workers' Party of Germany (SAPD)

He died in Switzerland in 1875.

Works
Schweitzer composed a number of dramas and comedies, of which several for a while had considerable success. Among them may be mentioned:
Alcibiades (Frankfurt, 1858)Friedrich Barbarossa (Frankfurt, 1858)Canossa (Berlin, 1872)Die Darwinianer (Frankfurt, 1875)Die Eidechse (Frankfurt, 1876)Epidemisch (Frankfurt, 1876)
He also wrote one political novel, Lucinde oder Kapital und Arbeit'' (Frankfurt, 1864).

References

Attribution

1833 births
1875 deaths
19th-century German male writers
19th-century German writers
19th-century German LGBT people
19th-century poets
Burials at Frankfurt Main Cemetery
Gay politicians
German gay writers
General German Workers' Association politicians
German LGBT poets
German male poets
German poets
Humboldt University of Berlin alumni
LGBT nobility
German LGBT politicians
People prosecuted under anti-homosexuality laws
Politicians from Frankfurt